Tishman Building may refer to:

10 Lafayette Square, Buffalo, New York, United States
666 Fifth Avenue, Manhattan, New York, United States